The 2021–22 BFF U-16 Football Tournament was the inaugural edition of BFF U-16 Football Tournament. The youth teams of 11 BCL clubs competing in the tournament. It was played from 20 September to 11 October 2022 at two venues in Dhaka.

Karan Bazar PS U-16 is the defending champion having won against Wari Club U-16 by 3–0 goals in the final on 11 October 2022.

Format
All the participant teams will be divided into two groups. Every team will play once against the other teams of their group in group phase. The champion and runners-up of both groups will qualify for semi-final.

Participating teams
The following eleven team were participated in the tournament.

Draw
The draw ceremony were held at BFF house at Motijheel, Dhaka on 18 September 2022.

Round Matches Dates

Venues
All matches will be played following two ground.

Group stages
All matches will be played at Dhaka, Bangladesh.
Times listed are UTC+6:00.

Group A

Group B

Knockout stage
 In the knockout stage, extra time and penalty shoot-out are used to decide the winner if necessary.

Bracket

Semi-finals

Final

Winners

Goalscorers

Awards

See also
 BFF U-18 Football League(2021-22)

References

Football cup competitions in Bangladesh
Youth football in Bangladesh
Football leagues in Bangladesh